Santa Severa is a frazione of the comune of Santa Marinella, in the province of Rome, Lazio, Italy.

It takes its name from the 2nd-century Christian martyr. The village includes a small medieval town with a 9th-century castle facing the sea, where the ancient Etruscan port of Pyrgi was once located. The Pyrgi Tablets were found here in 1964.

Filmography
 Medici: Masters of Florence TV series (S1E01).
 Three Steps Over Heaven.
 Salvo D'Acquisto.

References

External links 
  Medieval castle of Santa Severa
 Archeologia con fantasmi

Frazioni of the Province of Rome
Coastal towns in Lazio
Castles in Italy